Raúl García de Mateos Rubio (born 5 July 1982 in Manzanares, Ciudad Real) is a Spanish racing cyclist. His brother Vicente García de Mateos is also a racing cyclist.

Major results

2004
 9th Overall Volta a Lleida
2008
 1st Overall Vuelta a Toledo
 1st Stage 4 Tour of Galicia
 9th Overall Vuelta a Extremadura
 10th Overall Circuito Montañes
2009
 5th Overall Cinturó de l'Empordà
2010
 1st Overall Tour of Galicia
 1st Stage 3 Vuelta a Ávila
 1st Stage 4 Vuelta a Zamora
2011
 8th Overall Vuelta Ciclista a León
2012
 1st  Road race, National Amateur Road Championships
 9th Overall Vuelta Ciclista a León
2013
 1st Trofeo Iberdrola
2018
 1st Overall Vuelta a Salamanca
 1st Clásica de Pascua
2019
 1st Overall Volta a Coruña
1st Stage 1
 3rd Overall Tour of Galicia

References

External links

1982 births
Living people
Spanish male cyclists
Sportspeople from the Province of Ciudad Real
Cyclists from Castilla-La Mancha